The list of ship decommissionings in 1931 includes a chronological list of all ships decommissioned in 1931.


January

31 January 

 Luce:  Decommissioned, later sold for scrap

February

16 Fedruary 

 USS Florida: Decommissioned, later scrapped due to London Naval Treaty of 1930

March

24 March 

 Lansdale:  Decommissioned, later sold for scrap

June

1 June 

 Hart:  Decommissioned, later sold for scrap

References

1931
 
Ship